Miki's Law is a law passed in Kansas, United States in 2006, named after Miki Martinez, a 19-year-old resident of Great Bend, who was fatally shot in 2004.  The law creates a registry of people convicted of felonies using a handgun or other deadly weapons, so that law enforcement and the public would know when a convicted felon moves to their area.

Kansas statutes
2006 in American law
2006 in Kansas